Timothy Turner (1585–1677) was an English judge.

Timothy Turner or Tim Turner may also refer to:

Timothy Turner (actor), voice actor featured in shows including The Many Adventures of Winnie the Pooh
Tim Turner (1924–1987), British actor
Tim Turner (Canadian rower) (born 1959)
Tim Turner (English rower) (fl. 1938)
Timmy T. Turner, fictional TV character (The Fairly OddParents)
William Irving Turner (1890–1950), U.S. Forest Service architect known as Tim Turner